Thomas Edward Yorke (born 7 October 1968) is an English musician and the main vocalist and songwriter of the rock band Radiohead. A multi-instrumentalist, he mainly plays guitar and keyboards and is noted for his falsetto. He has been described by Rolling Stone as one of the greatest and most influential singers of his generation.

Yorke formed Radiohead with schoolmates at Abingdon School in Oxfordshire, and studied at the University of Exeter. In 1991, Radiohead signed to Parlophone; their 1992 debut single, "Creep", made Yorke a celebrity, and Radiohead went on to achieve critical acclaim and sales of over 30 million albums. Yorke's early influences included alternative rock acts such as Pixies and R.E.M; with Radiohead's fourth album, Kid A (2000), Yorke moved into electronic music, influenced by Warp acts such as Aphex Twin. With the artist Stanley Donwood, Yorke creates artwork for Radiohead albums and his other projects. He often incorporates "erratic" dancing into his performances.

Yorke's solo work comprises mainly electronic music. His debut solo album, The Eraser, was released in 2006. To perform it live, in 2009 he formed a new band, Atoms for Peace, with musicians including the Red Hot Chili Peppers bassist Flea and the Radiohead producer Nigel Godrich. They released an album, Amok, in 2013. Yorke's second solo album, Tomorrow's Modern Boxes, was released in 2014, followed by Anima in 2019. In 2021, Yorke debuted a new band, the Smile, with the Radiohead guitarist Jonny Greenwood and the jazz drummer Tom Skinner. They released an album, A Light for Attracting Attention, in 2022. Yorke has collaborated with artists including PJ Harvey, Björk, Flying Lotus and Modeselektor, and has composed for film and theatre; his first feature film soundtrack, Suspiria, was released in October 2018.

Yorke is an activist on behalf of human rights, animal rights, environmental and anti-war causes, and his lyrics incorporate political themes. He has been critical of the music industry, particularly of major labels and streaming services such as Spotify. With Radiohead and his solo work, he has pioneered alternative release platforms such as pay-what-you-want and BitTorrent. Along with the other members of Radiohead, he was inducted into the Rock and Roll Hall of Fame in 2019.

Early life
Yorke was born on 7 October 1968 in Wellingborough, Northamptonshire. He was born with a paralysed left eye, and underwent five eye operations by the age of six. According to Yorke, the last surgery was "botched", giving him a drooping eyelid. He decided against further surgery: "I decided I liked the fact that it wasn't the same, and I've liked it ever since. And when people say stuff I kind of thought it was a badge of pride, and still do."

The family moved frequently. Shortly after Yorke's birth, his father, a nuclear physicist and later a chemical equipment salesman, was hired by a firm in Scotland. The family lived in Lundin Links until Yorke was seven, and he moved from school to school. The family settled in Oxfordshire in 1978, where Yorke attended Standlake Primary School.

Yorke said he knew he would become a rock star after seeing the Queen guitarist Brian May on television for the first time at the age of eight. He received his first guitar as a child; at 10, he made his own guitar, inspired by May's homemade Red Special. By 11, he had joined his first band and written his first song. Seeing Siouxsie Sioux in concert at the Apollo in 1985 inspired him to become a performer, saying he had never seen anyone "captivate an audience like she did".

Yorke attended the boys' public school Abingdon in Oxfordshire. He felt out of place, and got into physical fights with other students. He found sanctuary in the music and art departments, and wrote music for a school production of A Midsummer Night's Dream. Terence Gilmore-James, the Abingdon director of music, recalled Yorke as "forlorn and a little isolated" thanks to his unusual appearance, but talkative and opinionated. He said Yorke was "not a great musician", unlike his future bandmate Jonny Greenwood, but a "thinker and experimenter". Yorke later credited the support of Gilmore-James and the head of the art department for his success.

1985–1991: On a Friday 

At Abingdon, Yorke met Ed O'Brien, Philip Selway and brothers Colin and Jonny Greenwood. In 1985, they formed a band, On a Friday, named after the only day they were allowed to practise.

After leaving school, Yorke took a gap year and tried to become a professional musician. He held several jobs, including a period selling suits, and made a demo tape. He was also involved in a serious car accident that influenced the lyrics of later songs, including the Bends B-side "Killer Cars" (1995) and "Airbag" from OK Computer (1997). In the late 1980s, Yorke made a solo album, Dearest, which O'Brien described as similar to the Jesus and Mary Chain, with delay and reverb effects.

On the strength of their first demo, On a Friday were offered a record deal by Island Records, but the members decided they were not ready and wanted to go to university first. Yorke had wanted to apply to St John's to read English at the University of Oxford, but, he said, "I was told I couldn't even apply – I was too thick. Oxford University would have eaten me up and spat me out. It's too rigorous."

In late 1988, Yorke left Oxford to study English and fine arts at the University of Exeter, which put On a Friday on hiatus aside from rehearsals during breaks. At Exeter, Yorke performed experimental music with a classical ensemble, played in a techno group called Flickernoise, and played with the band Headless Chickens, performing songs including future Radiohead material. He also met the artist Stanley Donwood, who went on to produce artwork for Radiohead and Yorke's solo releases, and the printmaker Rachel Owen, Yorke's future wife. Yorke credited his art school education for preparing him creatively for his later work.

On a Friday resumed activity in 1991 as most of the members were finishing their degrees. Ronan Munro, editor of the Oxford music magazine Curfew, gave the band their first interview while they were sharing a house in Oxford. He recalled that "Thom wasn't like anyone I'd interviewed before ... He was like 'This is going to happen… failure is not an option' ... He wasn't some ranting diva or a megalomaniac, but he was so focused on what he wanted to do."

Career

1991–1993: "Creep" and rise to fame 
In 1991, when Yorke was 22, On a Friday signed to Parlophone and changed their name to Radiohead. According to Yorke, around this time he "hit the self-destruct button pretty quickly"; he cut his hair and drank heavily, often becoming too drunk to perform. Radiohead gained notice with their debut single, "Creep", which appeared on their 1993 debut album, Pablo Honey.

Yorke said that the success inflated his ego; he tried to project himself as a rock star, which included bleaching his hair and wearing extensions. He said: "When I got back to Oxford I was unbearable ... as soon as you get any success you disappear up your own arse."

1994–1997: The Bends 
Paul Q Kolderie, the co-producer of Pablo Honey, observed that Yorke's songwriting improved dramatically after Pablo Honey. O'Brien later said: "After all that touring on Pablo Honey ... the songs that Thom was writing were so much better. Over a period of a year and a half, suddenly, bang." Recording Radiohead's second album, The Bends (1995), was stressful, with the band pressured to release a follow-up to "Creep". Yorke in particular struggled with the pressure; according to the band's co-manager Chris Hufford, "Thom became totally confused about what he wanted to do, what he was doing in a band and in his life, and that turned into a mistrust of everybody else."

The Bends received critical acclaim and brought Radiohead wider international attention. The American rock band R.E.M., a major influence on Radiohead, picked them as their support act for their European tour. Yorke befriended the R.E.M. singer Michael Stipe, who gave him advice about how to deal with fame. Yorke joined R.E.M. to perform their song "E-Bow the Letter" on several occasions from 1998 to 2004.

1997–1998: OK Computer 
During the production of Radiohead's third album, OK Computer (1997), the members had differing opinions and equal production roles, with Yorke having "the loudest voice", according to O'Brien. OK Computer achieved critical acclaim and strong sales, establishing Radiohead as one of the leading rock acts of the 1990s, but Yorke was ambivalent about success.

In 1997, Yorke provided backing vocals for a cover of the 1975 Pink Floyd song "Wish You Were Here" with Sparklehorse. The following year, he duetted on "El President" with Isabel Monteiro of Drugstore, and sang on the Unkle track "Rabbit in Your Headlights", a collaboration with DJ Shadow. Pitchfork cited "Rabbit in Your Headlights" as a "turning point" for Yorke, foreshadowing Radiohead's later work in experimental electronic music. 

For the soundtrack of the 1998 film Velvet Goldmine, Yorke, Jonny Greenwood, Andy Mackay of Roxy Music and Bernard Butler of Suede formed a band, the Venus in Furs, to cover Roxy Music songs. In 2016, Pitchfork wrote that Yorke "weirdly comes off as the weak link", with understated vocals that did not resemble the Roxy Music singer Bryan Ferry.

2000–2004: Kid A, Amnesiac and Hail to the Thief 
Following the OK Computer tour, Yorke suffered a mental breakdown and found it impossible to write new music. He was approached to score the 1999 film Fight Club, but declined as he was recovering from stress. He said later:

To recuperate, Yorke moved to Cornwall and spent time walking the cliffs, writing and drawing. He restricted his songwriting to piano; the first song he wrote was "Everything in Its Right Place". During this period, Yorke listened almost exclusively to the electronic music of artists such as Aphex Twin and Autechre, saying: "It was refreshing because the music was all structures and had no human voices in it. But I felt just as emotional about it as I'd ever felt about guitar music."

Radiohead took these influences to their next albums Kid A (2000) and Amnesiac (2001), processing vocals, obscuring lyrics, and using electronic instruments such as synthesisers, drum machines and samplers. The albums divided fans and critics, but were commercially successful and later attracted wide acclaim; at the turn of the decade, Kid A was named the best album of the 2000s by Rolling Stone and Pitchfork.

In 2000, Yorke contributed vocals to three tracks on the PJ Harvey album Stories from the City, Stories from the Sea, and duetted with Björk on her Oscar-nominated song "I've Seen It All". Radiohead released their sixth album, Hail to the Thief, a blend of rock and electronic music, in 2003. Yorke wrote many of its lyrics in response to the War on Terror and the resurgence of right-wing politics in the west after the turn of the millennium, and his shifting worldview after becoming a father. Yorke and Jonny Greenwood contributed to the 2004 Band Aid 20 single "Do They Know It's Christmas?", produced by Godrich.

2004–2008: The Eraser and In Rainbows 
Yorke recorded his debut solo album, The Eraser, during Radiohead's 2004 hiatus. He said: "I've been in the band since we left school and never dared do anything on my own... It was like, 'Man, I've got to find out what it feels like,' you know?" He stressed that Radiohead were not splitting up and that the album was made "with their blessing". According to Jonny Greenwood, Radiohead were happy for Yorke to make the album; he said, "He'd go mad if every time he wrote a song it had to go through the Radiohead consensus."

The Eraser was released in 2006 on the independent label XL Recordings, backed by the singles "Harrowdown Hill", which reached number 23 in the UK Singles Chart, and "Analyse". It reached the top ten in the UK, Ireland, United States, Canada and Australia, and was nominated for the 2006 Mercury Prize and the 2007 Grammy Award for Best Alternative Music Album. It was followed by a B-sides compilation, Spitting Feathers, and a remix album by various artists, The Eraser Rmxs.

In 2007, Radiohead independently released their seventh album, In Rainbows, as a pay-what-you-want download, the first for a major act. The release made headlines worldwide and sparked debate about the implications for the music industry. In the same year, Yorke provided vocals for the Modeselektor tracks "The White Flash" from Happy Birthday (2007). Yorke sang backing vocals on Björk's 2008 charity single "Náttúra", and the following year recorded a cover of the Miracle Legion song "All for the Best" with his brother Andy for the compilation Ciao My Shining Star: The Songs of Mark Mulcahy.

2009–2013: Atoms for Peace 
In July 2009, Yorke performed solo at the Latitude Festival in Suffolk and released a double-A-side single, "FeelingPulledApartByHorses/TheHollowEarth". He also contributed the track "Hearing Damage" to the Twilight Saga: New Moon film soundtrack.

In 2009, Yorke formed a new band, Atoms for Peace, to perform songs from The Eraser. Alongside Yorke on vocals, guitar and keyboards, the band comprises Godrich on keyboards and guitar, the bassist Flea of the Red Hot Chili Peppers, the drummer Joey Waronker and the percussionist Mauro Refosco of Forro in the Dark. Yorke said: "God love 'em but I've been playing with [Radiohead] since I was 16, and to do this was quite a trip ... It felt like we'd knocked a hole in a wall, and we should just fucking go through it."

Atoms for Peace performed eight North American shows in 2010. They went unnamed for early performances, billed as "Thom Yorke" or "??????". In June, Yorke performed a surprise set at Glastonbury Festival with Jonny Greenwood, performing Eraser and Radiohead songs. In the same year, Yorke provided vocals for "...And the World Laughs with You" from the Flying Lotus album Cosmogramma, and for "Shipwreck" and "This" on the Modeselektor album Monkeytown. Along with Damien Rice and Philip Glass, he contributed to the soundtrack for the 2010 documentary When the Dragon Swallowed the Sun. The following year, Yorke collaborated with the electronic artists Burial and Four Tet on "Ego" and "Mirror", and he and Greenwood collaborated with the American rapper MF Doom on "Retarded Fren".

2011–2013: The King of Limbs and Amok 
In 2011, Radiohead released their eighth album, The King of Limbs, which Yorke described as "an expression of physical movements and wildness". Yorke sought to move further from conventional recording methods. The music video for the track "Lotus Flower", featuring Yorke's erratic dancing, became an internet meme.

Yorke remixed the 2012 single "Hold On" by the electronic musician Sbtrkt under the name Sisi BakBak. His identity was not confirmed until September 2014. He also provided vocals for "Electric Candyman" on the Flying Lotus album Until the Quiet Comes (2012).

In February 2013, Atoms for Peace released an album, Amok, followed by a tour of Europe, the US and Japan. Amok received generally positive reviews, though some critics felt it was too similar to Yorke's solo work. That year, Yorke and Jonny Greenwood contributed music to The UK Gold, a documentary about tax avoidance. The soundtrack was released free in February 2015 through the online audio platform SoundCloud.

2014–2017: Tomorrow's Modern Boxes 
Yorke released his second solo album, Tomorrow's Modern Boxes, via BitTorrent on 26 September 2014. It became the most torrented album of 2014 (excluding piracy), with over a million downloads in its first six days. Yorke and Godrich hoped to use the BitTorrent release to hand "some control of internet commerce back to people who are creating the work". In December 2014, Yorke released the album on the online music platform Bandcamp along with a new track, "Youwouldn'tlikemewhenI'mangry".

In 2015, Yorke contributed a soundtrack, Subterranea, to an installation of Radiohead artwork, The Panic Office, in Sydney, Australia. The soundtrack, composed of field recordings made in the English countryside, played on speakers at different heights with different frequency ranges. The radio station Triple J described it as similar to the ambient sections of Tomorrow's Modern Boxes, with some digitally spoken sections similar to "Fitter Happier" from OK Computer. The music was not released. In July 2015, Yorke joined the band Portishead at the Latitude Festival to perform their song "The Rip".

Yorke composed music for a 2015 production of Harold Pinter's 1971 play Old Times by the Roundabout Theater Company in New York City. The director described the music as "primeval, unusual ... the sort of neurosis within [Yorke's] music certainly has elucidated elements of the compulsive repetition of the play." That year, Yorke performed with Godrich and the audiovisual artist Tarik Barri at the Latitude Festival in the UK and the Summer Sonic Festival in Japan. Radiohead released their ninth album, A Moon Shaped Pool, on 8 May 2016. Yorke contributed vocals and appeared in the video for "Beautiful People" on Mark Pritchard's 2016 album Under the Sun.

2018–2019: Suspiria 
Yorke's first feature film soundtrack, Suspiria, composed for the 2018 horror film, was released on 26 October 2018 by XL. It was produced by Yorke and Sam Petts-Davies and features the London Contemporary Orchestra and Choir and Yorke's son Noah on drums. Yorke cited inspiration from the 1982 Blade Runner soundtrack and music from Surpiria's 1977 Berlin setting, such as krautrock. The lyrics do not follow the film narrative and were influenced by discourse surrounding President Donald Trump and Brexit. "Suspirium" was nominated for Best Song Written for Visual Media at the 2020 Grammy Awards.

Yorke performed two shows in 2017, and toured Europe and the US in 2018. That year, Yorke and the artist Tarik Barri created an audiovisual exhibition, "City Rats", commissioned by the Institute for Sound and Music in Berlin. I See You, a limited-edition zine edited by Yorke with Crack Magazine, was published in September 2018, with profits donated to Greenpeace. Yorke contributed music to the 2018 short films Why Can't We Get Along? and Time of Day for the fashion label Rag & Bone.

Radiohead were inducted into the Rock and Roll Hall of Fame on 29 March 2019. Yorke did not attend the induction ceremony, citing cultural differences between the UK and America and his negative experience of the Brit Awards, "which is like this sort of drunken car crash that you don't want to get involved with".

2019–2020: Anima 

Yorke's third solo album, Anima, was released on 27 June 2019, accompanied by a short film directed by Paul Thomas Anderson. Anima became Yorke's first number-one album on the Billboard Dance/Electronic Albums chart. At the 2020 Grammy Awards, it was nominated for Best Alternative Music Album and Best Boxed or Special Limited Edition Package; the Anima film was nominated for the Grammy for Best Music Film. The album was followed by Not the News Rmx EP, comprising an extended version of the track "Not the News" plus remixes by various artists. A solo tour set to begin in March 2020 was canceled due to the COVID-19 pandemic.

For the 2019 film Motherless Brooklyn, Yorke wrote "Daily Battles", with horns by his Atoms for Peace bandmate Flea. The director, Edward Norton, enlisted the jazz musician Wynton Marsalis to rearrange the song as a ballad reminiscent of 1950s Miles Davis. It was shortlisted for Best Original Song at the 92nd Academy Awards. Yorke's first classical composition, "Don't Fear the Light", written for the piano duo Katia and Marielle Labeque, debuted in April 2019. In April 2020, Yorke performed a new song from his home, "Plasticine Figures", for The Tonight Show. In the same year, he collaborated with Four Tet and Burial again on "Her Revolution" and "His Rope", and remixed "Isolation Theme" by the electronic artist Clark. Yorke said his remix mirrored the COVID-19 lockdowns, "entering a new type of silence".

2021–present: the Smile 
In March 2021, Yorke contributed music to shows by the Japanese fashion designer Jun Takahashi, including a remixed version of "Creep". That August, he contributed two remixes of "Gazzillion Ear" by the rapper MF Doom.

In May, Yorke debuted a new band, the Smile, with Jonny Greenwood and the jazz drummer Tom Skinner, produced by Godrich. Greenwood said the project was a way for him and Yorke to work together during the COVID-19 lockdowns. The Smile made their surprise debut in a performance streamed by Glastonbury Festival on May 22, with Yorke singing and playing guitar, bass, Moog synthesiser and Rhodes piano. The Guardian critic Alexis Petridis said the Smile "sound like a simultaneously more skeletal and knottier version of Radiohead", exploring more progressive rock influences with unusual time signatures, complex riffs and "hard-driving" motorik psychedelia. That October, Yorke performed a Smile song, "Free in the Knowledge", at the Letters Live event at the Royal Albert Hall, London, and he and Stanley Donwood curated an exhibition of Kid A artwork and lyrics at Christie's headquarters in London.

On 9 April 2022, Yorke performed a solo concert at the Zeltbühne festival in Zermatt, Switzerland, playing songs from his work with Radiohead, the Smile and Unkle, and his solo records. In May 2022, the Smile released their debut album, A Light for Attracting Attention, and began a European tour. Yorke contributed two songs, "5.17" and "That's How Horses Are", to the sixth series of the television drama Peaky Blinders. Yorke executive-produced Sus Dog (2023), the tenth album by Clark. Yorke acted as a mentor for Clark's vocals and contributed vocals and bass.

Artistry

Yorke writes the first versions of most Radiohead songs, after which they are developed harmonically by Jonny Greenwood before the other band members develop their parts. He said the nature of being a creative person was "to retain a beginner's mind. The search is the point. The flailing around is the point. The process is the point."

Yorke's solo work comprises mainly electronic music. Stereogum characterised it as "largely interior", "frigid" and "beat-driven", unlike the "wide-open horizons" of Radiohead songs.

Yorke has worked with the producer Nigel Godrich on most of his projects, including Radiohead, the Smile and most of his solo work. Yorke credits Godrich with helping edit his work, identifying which parts need improvement and which have potential. He said they sometimes have arguments that last for days, but that they always resolve their differences, likening their relationship to brothers. Godrich said the pair were "very productive together and that's a really precious and important thing and it changes within the context of whatever we're doing".

Musicianship 
Yorke is a multi-instrumentalist, and plays instruments including guitar, piano, bass and drums. He played drums for performances of the 2007 Radiohead song "Bangers and Mash". With the Smile, Yorke has used a Fender Mustang bass with a fingerstyle technique.

Yorke uses electronic instruments such as synthesisers, drum machines and sequencers, and electronic techniques including programming, sampling and looping. In 2015, he said: "Really I just enjoy writing words sitting at a piano. I tend to lose interest in the drum machine." According to Godrich, "Thom will sit down and make some crazy, fractured cheese-grater-on-head mayhem on a computer, but at some point he always gets his guitar out to check he can actually play it."

Unlike his bandmate Jonny Greenwood, Yorke does not read sheet music; he said: "You can't express the rhythms properly like that. It's a very ineffective way of doing it, so I've never really bothered picking it up." Explaining why he turned down a request to play piano on the song "Mr. Bellamy" on Paul McCartney's album Memory Almost Full (2007), Yorke said: "The piano playing involved two hands doing things separately. I don't have that skill available. I said to him, 'I strum piano, that's it.'"

Vocals 

Yorke has one of the widest vocal ranges in popular music. He is known for his falsetto, which Paste described as "sweet", "cautious" and "haunting". Rolling Stone described his voice as a "broad, emotive sweep" with a "high, keening sound". The Guardian described it as "instrument-like" and "spectral", and wrote that it "transcends the egocentric posturing of the indie rock singer stereotype". The music journalist Robert Christgau wrote that Yorke's voice has "a pained, transported intensity, pure up top with hints of hysterical grit below ... Fraught and self-involved with no time for jokes, not asexual but otherwise occupied, and never ever common, this is the idealised voice of a pretentious college boy ... Like it or not the voice is remarkable."

Yorke often manipulates his voice with software and effects, transforming it into a "disembodied instrument". For example, on "Everything in Its Right Place" (2000), his vocals are treated to create a "glitching, stuttering collage". Pitchfork wrote in 2016 that, over the decades, Yorke's voice had evolved from "semi-interesting alt-rocker" to "left-field art-rock demigod" to "electronic grand wizard". In 2006, Yorke said: "It annoys me how pretty my voice is. That sounds incredibly immodest, but it annoys me how polite it can sound when perhaps what I'm singing is deeply acidic." He said he keeps vocals in mind whenever he builds music, no matter the genre: "It's almost impossible for me to listen to a dance tune from beginning to end without picturing a voice."

In 2005, readers of Blender and MTV2 voted Yorke the 18th-greatest singer of all time. In 2008, Rolling Stone ranked him the 66th-greatest and wrote that he was one of the most influential singers of his generation, influencing bands including Muse, Coldplay, Travis and Elbow. In their updated 2023 list, Rolling Stone ranked him the 34th-greatest singer of all time, praising the "genuine edge of alienation" in his voice.

Lyrics 
Though Yorke's early lyrics were personal, from Kid A he experimented with cutting up words and phrases and assembling them at random. He deliberately uses cliches, idioms and other common expressions, suggesting "a mind consumed by meaningless data". For example, according to the Pitchfork writer Rob Mitchum, the Kid A lyrics feature "hum-drum observations twisted into panic attacks". The New Republic writer Ryan Kearney speculated that Yorke's use of common expressions, which he described as "Radioheadisms", was an attempt "to sap our common tongue of meaning and expose the vapidity of everyday discourse". A 2021 study found that Yorke had among the largest vocabularies of pop singers, based on the number of different words used in each song.

Yorke's lyrics express paranoia; the Guardian critic Alexis Petridis described "what you might call the Yorke worldview: that life is a waking nightmare and everything is completely and perhaps irreparably screwed". According to Yorke, many of his lyrics are motivated by anger, expressing his political and environmental concerns and written as "a constant response to doublethink". The lyrics of the 2003 Radiohead album Hail to the Thief dealt with what Yorke called the "ignorance and intolerance and panic and stupidity" following the 2000 election of US President George W. Bush and the unfolding War on Terror. Yorke wrote his 2006 single "Harrowdown Hill" about David Kelly, the British weapons expert and whistleblower. In a 2008 television performance of "House of Cards", Yorke dedicated the "denial, denial" refrain to Bush for rejecting the Kyoto Protocol, an international treaty to reduce greenhouse gases. The 2011 single "The Daily Mail" attacks the right-wing Daily Mail newspaper.

In a 2015 interview with the activist and writer George Monbiot, Yorke said: "In the 60s, you could write songs that were like calls to arms, and it would work ... It's much harder to do that now. If I was going to write a protest song about climate change in 2015, it would be shit. It's not like one song or one piece of art or one book is going to change someone's mind." Working on Radiohead's ninth album, A Moon Shaped Pool, Yorke worried that political songs alienated some listeners, but decided it was better than writing "another lovey-dovey song about nothing". Pitchfork wrote that Yorke's lyrics on A Moon Shaped Pool were less cynical, conveying wonder and amazement. Many critics felt the album's lyrics might address Yorke's separation from Rachel Owen, his partner of more than 20 years. However, in 2019, Yorke denied writing biographically, saying he instead writes "spasmodic" lyrics based on imagery.

Dance 
Yorke often incorporates dance into his performances, described by the Times as his "on-stage signature". He began dancing on stage after Radiohead released Kid A in 2000, as "I suddenly didn't have a guitar around my neck". His dancing features in music videos for songs such as "Lotus Flower" and "Ingenue", and the short film Anima. Critics have described it as "erratic", "flailing" and unconventional. In 2011, Rolling Stone readers voted Yorke their 10th-favourite dancing musician.

Influences 
As a child, Yorke's favourite artists included Queen. He said the acts that "changed his life" as a teenager were R.E.M., Siouxsie and the Banshees, Joy Division and Bob Dylan. He also wrote that Mark Mulcahy of Miracle Legion had affected him "a great deal" at this time: "It was the voice of someone who was only truly happy when he was singing ... It changed the way I thought about songs and singing."

When he was 16, Yorke sent a demo to a music magazine, who wrote that he sounded like Neil Young. Unfamiliar with Young, Yorke purchased his 1970 album After the Gold Rush and "immediately fell in love with his music". Yorke said: "It was his attitude toward the way he laid songs down. It's always about laying down whatever is in your head at the time and staying completely true to that, no matter what it is." Yorke also credited Young as a major lyrical influence. In 1997, Yorke said that Jeff Buckley had given him the confidence to sing in falsetto.

Yorke cited the Pixies, Björk and PJ Harvey as artists who "changed his life", and in 2006 he told Pitchfork that Radiohead had "ripped off R.E.M. blind for years". He said that Michael Stipe of R.E.M. is his favourite lyricist: "I loved the way he would take an emotion and then take a step back from it and in doing so make it so much more powerful." The chorus of "How to Disappear Completely" from Kid A was inspired by Stipe, who advised Yorke to relieve tour stress by repeating to himself: "I'm not here, this isn't happening." Yorke cited the Red Hot Chili Peppers guitarist John Frusciante as an influence on his guitar playing on In Rainbows, and Scott Walker as an influence on his vocals and lyrics.

After OK Computer, Yorke and Radiohead incorporated influences from electronic artists such as Aphex Twin and Autechre. In 2013, Yorke cited Aphex Twin as his biggest influence, saying: "He burns a heavy shadow ... Aphex opened up another world that didn't involve my fucking electric guitar ... I hated all the music that was around Radiohead at the time, it was completely fucking meaningless. I hated the Britpop thing and what was happening in America, but Aphex was totally beautiful."

Artwork 
Since My Iron Lung (1994), Yorke has created artwork for Radiohead and his other projects with Stanley Donwood. The pair met as art students at the University of Exeter; Donwood said his first impression of Yorke was that he was "mouthy. Pissed off. Someone I could work with." Yorke is credited for artwork alongside Donwood as the White Chocolate Farm, Tchock, Dr. Tchock and similar abbreviations.

Whereas Donwood described himself as having a "tendency towards Virgo-like detailing and perfectionism", he said Yorke is "completely opposed, fucking everything up ... I do something, then he fucks it up, then I fuck up what he's done … and we keep doing that until we're happy with the result. It's a competition to see who 'wins' the painting, which one of us takes possession of it in an artistic way." The artist Tarik Barri provides live visuals for Yorke's solo and multimedia projects and shows with Atoms for Peace.

Politics and activism

Music industry 
Yorke has been critical of the music industry and has pioneered alternative release platforms with Radiohead and his solo work. Following Radiohead's tour of America in 1993, he became disenchanted with being "right at the sharp end of the sexy, sassy, MTV eye-candy lifestyle" he felt he was helping sell. After a 1995 Melody Maker article suggested that Yorke would kill himself like the Nirvana singer Kurt Cobain, Yorke developed an aversion to the British music press.

The 1998 documentary Meeting People Is Easy portrays Yorke's disaffection with the music industry and press during Radiohead's OK Computer tour. After Radiohead's fourth album, Kid A (2000), was leaked via the peer-to-peer filesharing software Napster weeks before release, Yorke told Time he felt Napster "encourages enthusiasm for music in a way that the music industry has long forgotten to do. I think anybody sticking two fingers up at the whole fucking thing is wonderful as far as I'm concerned."

After Radiohead's record contract with EMI ended with the release of Hail to the Thief (2003), Yorke told Time: "I like the people at our record company, but the time is at hand when you have to ask why anyone needs one. And, yes, it probably would give us some perverse pleasure to say 'Fuck you' to this decaying business model." In 2006, he called major record labels "stupid little boys' games – especially really high up". Radiohead independently released their 2007 album In Rainbows as a download for which listeners could choose their price; Yorke said the "most exciting" part of the release was the removal of the barrier between artist and audience. However, in 2013, Yorke told the Guardian he feared the In Rainbows release had instead played into the hands of content providers such as Apple and Google: "They have to keep commodifying things to keep the share price up, but in doing so they have made all content, including music and newspapers, worthless, in order to make their billions. And this is what we want?" In 2015, he criticised YouTube for "seizing control" of contributor content, likening it to Nazis looting art during World War II.

In 2013, Yorke and Godrich made headlines for their criticism of the music streaming service Spotify, and removed Atoms for Peace and Yorke's solo music from the service. In a series of tweets, Yorke wrote: "Make no mistake, new artists you discover on Spotify will not get paid. Meanwhile, shareholders will shortly be rolling in it ... New artists get paid fuck-all with this model." Yorke called Spotify "the last gasp of the old industry", accusing it of only benefiting major labels with large back catalogues, and encouraged artists to build their own "direct connections" with audiences instead. Brian Message, a partner at Radiohead's management company, disagreed with Yorke, noting that Spotify pays 70 percent of its revenue back to the music industry. He said that "Thom's issue was that the pipe has become so jammed ... We encourage all of our artists to take a long-term approach ... Plan for the long term, understand that it's a tough game." Yorke's music was re-added to Spotify in December 2017. 

For Yorke's second solo album, Tomorrow's Modern Boxes (2014), released via BitTorrent, he and Godrich expressed their hope to "hand some control of internet back to people who are creating the work ... bypassing the self-elected gatekeepers". Asked if the release had been a success, Yorke said: "No, not exactly ... I wanted to show that, in theory, today one could follow the entire chain of record production, from start to finish, on his own. But in practice it is very different. We cannot be burdened with all of the responsibilities of the record label."

Climate change 
In 2000, during the recording of Kid A, Yorke became "obsessed" with the Worldwatch Institute website, "which was full of scary statistics about icecaps melting and weather patterns changing". He said he became involved in the movement to halt climate change after having children and "waking up every night just terrified".

Yorke has been a supporter of Friends of the Earth and their Big Ask Campaign since 2003. He and Jonny Greenwood headlined the Big Ask Live, a 2006 benefit concert to persuade the government to enact a new law on climate change. In a Guardian article, Yorke wrote:

In 2006, Yorke refused an invitation from Friends of the Earth to meet the British prime minister, Tony Blair, to discuss climate change. Yorke said that Blair had "no environmental credentials" and that his spin doctors would manipulate the meeting. He told the Guardian that Blair's advisers had wanted to vet Yorke beforehand, and that Friends of the Earth would lose access if Yorke said "the wrong thing" afterwards, which he equated to blackmail.

In 2008, Radiohead commissioned a study to reduce the carbon expended on tour. Based on the findings, they chose to play at venues supported by public transport, made deals with trucking companies to reduce emissions, used new low-energy LED lighting and encouraged festivals to offer reusable plastics. That year, Yorke guest-edited a special climate change edition of Observer Magazine and wrote: "Unlike pessimists such as James Lovelock, I don't believe we are all doomed ... You should never give up hope."

In 2009, Yorke performed via Skype at the premier of the environmentalist documentary The Age of Stupid, and gained access to the COP 15 climate change talks in Copenhagen by posing as a journalist. In 2010, he performed a benefit concert at the Cambridge Corn Exchange for the British Green Party and supported the 10:10 campaign for climate change mitigation. The following year, he joined the maiden voyage of Rainbow Warrior III, a yacht used by Greenpeace to monitor damage to the environment.

Yorke was one of several celebrities who endorsed the parliamentary candidacy of the Green candidate Caroline Lucas at the 2015 UK general election. In December 2015, he performed at the United Nations Climate Change Conference in Paris at a benefit concert in aid of 350.org, an environmental organisation raising awareness about climate change. His performance was included on the live album Pathway to Paris, released in July 2016. Yorke contributed an electronic track, "Hands Off the Antarctic", to a 2018 Greenpeace campaign.

2017 Israel concert 
In April 2017, more than 50 prominent figures, including the musicians Roger Waters and Thurston Moore, the rights activist Desmond Tutu and the filmmaker Ken Loach, signed a petition urging Radiohead to cancel an Israel performance as part of Boycott, Divestment and Sanctions, a cultural boycott of Israel. In a Rolling Stone interview, Yorke said of the criticism: "I just can't understand why going to play a rock show or going to lecture at a university [is a problem to them] ... It's really upsetting that artists I respect think we are not capable of making a moral decision ourselves after all these years. They talk down to us and I just find it mind-boggling that they think they have the right to do that."

Yorke said that the petitioners had not contacted him. This was disputed by Waters, who wrote in an open letter in Rolling Stone that he had attempted to contact Yorke several times. In a statement, Yorke responded: "Playing in a country isn't the same as endorsing the government. Music, art and academia is about crossing borders not building them, about open minds not closed ones, about shared humanity, dialogue and freedom of expression."

Meat industry 
Yorke is vegetarian and has criticised the meat industry. He stopped eating meat partially out of the desire to attract a girl he liked. In a 2005 film for the animal rights foundation Animal Aid, he said: "Society deems it necessary to create this level of suffering in order for [people] to eat food that they don't need ... you should at least be aware of what you're doing rather than assuming that that's your right as a human being to do it."

Other issues
In 1999, Yorke travelled to the G8 summit to support the Jubilee 2000 movement calling for cancellation of third-world debt. In a 2003 Guardian article criticising the World Trade Organization, he wrote: "The west is creating an extremely dangerous economic, environmental and humanitarian time bomb. We are living beyond our means." In 2005, he performed at an all-night vigil for the Trade Justice Movement, calling for a better trade deal for poor countries.

In 2002, Yorke performed at the Bridge School Benefit, a charity concert organised by the American songwriter Neil Young, one of Yorke's influences. His set included a cover of Young's 1970 song "After the Gold Rush", performed on the piano Young wrote it on. In September 2004, Yorke was a key speaker at a Campaign for Nuclear Disarmament rally outside the Fylingdales air base in Yorkshire, protesting Tony Blair's support of the Bush administration's plans for the "Star Wars" missile defence system. In 2011, alongside Robert Del Naja of Massive Attack and Tim Goldsworthy of Unkle, Yorke played a secret DJ set for a group of Occupy activists in the abandoned offices of the investment bank UBS.

To celebrate the 2008 election of US president Barack Obama, Yorke released a remixed version of his single "Harrowdown Hill" as a free download. After the election of Donald Trump in 2016, he tweeted lyrics from Radiohead's single "Burn the Witch", interpreted as a criticism of Trump's policies. In June 2016, following the Orlando nightclub shooting in Florida, Yorke was one of nearly 200 music industry figures to sign an open letter published in Billboard urging the United States Congress to impose stricter gun control. He opposed Brexit, and in March 2019 joined the People's Vote march calling for a second referendum.

Personal life

Yorke lives in Oxfordshire. He practises yoga and meditation. He has suffered from anxiety and depression, which he treats with exercise, yoga and reading. Yorke's only sibling, his younger brother Andy, was the singer of the band Unbelievable Truth from 1993 until 2000.

For 23 years, Yorke was in a relationship with the artist and lecturer Rachel Owen, whom he met while studying at the University of Exeter. In 2012, Rolling Stone reported that Owen and Yorke were not married. However, The Times later found that they had married in a secret ceremony in Oxfordshire in May 2003. Their son, Noah, was born in 2001, and their daughter, Agnes, in 2004. Agnes collaborated on the artwork and Noah played drums on two tracks on Yorke's 2018 soundtrack album Suspiria. In September 2021, Noah released a song, "Trying Too Hard (Lullaby)"; NME likened its "ghostly" arrangement to Radiohead's album In Rainbows.

In August 2015, Yorke and Owen announced that they had separated amicably. Owen died from cancer on 18 December 2016, aged 48. In September 2020, Yorke married the Italian actress Dajana Roncione in Bagheria, Sicily. Roncione appears in the video for the Radiohead song "Lift" and Yorke's short film Anima.

Awards and nominations

{| class=wikitable
|-
! Award !! Year !! Work !! Category !! Result !! Ref. 
|-
! scope="row" rowspan=2|A2IM Libera Awards
| rowspan=2|2020
| Himself
|  Marketing Genius
| 
| rowspan=2|
|-
| Anima 
| Best Dance/Electronic Album
| 
|-
! scope="row" |Brit Awards
| 2007
| Himself
| British Male Solo Artist
| 
|
|-
! scope="row"| Chicago Film Critics Association Award
| 2018
| Suspiria
| Best Original Score
| 
|
|-
! scope="row"| David di Donatello
| 2020
| Suspiria
| Best Score
| 
|-
! scope="row" rowspan=5| Denmark GAFFA Awards
| 1998
| rowspan=4|Himself
| Best Foreign Songwriter
| 
| rowspan=5|
|-
| 2001
| rowspan=3|Best Foreign Male Act
| 
|-
| 2004
| 
|-
| rowspan=2|2006
| 
|-
| The Eraser
| Best Foreign Album
| 
|-
! scope="row" rowspan=5|Grammy Awards
| 2007
| The Eraser
| Best Alternative Music Album 
| 
|-
| rowspan=4|2020
| rowspan=3|Anima 
| Best Alternative Music Album 
| 
|-
| Best Boxed or Special Limited Edition Package
| 
|-
| Best Music Film 
| 
|-
| "Suspirium" 
| Best Song Written for Visual Media 
| 
|-
! scope="row" rowspan="2"|Libera Awards
| rowspan="2"|2020
| rowspan="2"|Anima
| Best Dance/Electronic Record
| 
| rowspan="2"|
|-
| Marketing Genius
| 
|-
! scope="row" |Mercury Prize
| 2006
| The Eraser
| Album of the Year
| 
|
|-
! scope="row" |NME Awards
| 2008
| Himself
| Hero of the Year
| 
|
|-
! scope="row" |Washington D.C. Area Film Critics Association
| 2018
| Suspiria
| Best Score
| 
|-
! scope="row" rowspan=4|UK Music Video Awards
| rowspan=3|2019
| rowspan=3|Anima 
| Best Special Video Project
| 
| rowspan=3|
|-
|  Best Production Design in a Video
| 
|-
| Best Choreography in a Video
| 
|-
| 2020
| "Last I Heard (...He Was Circling the Drain)"
| Best Alternative Video - UK
| 
|
|-
!scope="row" rowspan=4|Žebřík Music Awards
| 2000
| rowspan=4|Himself
| rowspan=4|Best International Male
| 
| rowspan=3|
|-
| 2001
| 
|-
| 2003
| 
|-
| 2005
| 
|

Solo discography

Studio albums
The Eraser (2006)
Tomorrow's Modern Boxes (2014)
Anima (2019)

Film soundtracks
When the Dragon Swallowed the Sun (2010; additional music only)
The UK Gold (2013; with Robert Del Naja)
Why Can't We Get Along (2018; Rag & Bone short film)
Time of Day (2018; Rag & Bone short film)
Suspiria (2018)

Albums produced
Suspiria (2018)
Sus Dog (2023; by Clark)

See also
 List of Old Abingdonians

References

Sources

 Randall, Mac. Exit Music: The Radiohead Story. Delta, 2000.

External links

 
 

1968 births
20th-century English singers
21st-century English singers
Alternative rock guitarists
Alternative rock pianists
Alternative rock singers
Alumni of the University of Exeter
Anti-consumerists
Anti-globalization activists
British alternative rock musicians
English activists
English electronic musicians
English environmentalists
English rock singers
English male singer-songwriters
English rock guitarists
Grammy Award winners
Ivor Novello Award winners
Living people
Male pianists
Music in Oxford
People with ptosis (eyelid)
People educated at Abingdon School
People from Wellingborough
Radiohead members
Rhythm guitarists
Atoms for Peace (band) members
English male guitarists
The Smile (band) members
Political music artists
XL Recordings artists
Love Da Records artists
BT Digital Music Awards winners